Houblon is a surname. Notable people of this surname include:

Abraham Houblon (1640–11 May 1722), Governor of the Bank of England, brother of James and John
Sir James Houblon (1629–1700), MP, Director of the Bank of England, brother of Abraham and John
Sir John Houblon (1632–1712), first Governor of the Bank of England, brother of Abraham and James
Jacob Houblon (1710–1770), MP

John Archer-Houblon (1773–1831), MP, descendant of the Bank of England Houblons 
Thomas Archer Houblon (1849–1933), Archdeacon of Oxford

See also
Houblon's Almshouses, Richmond
Houblon Apartments, part of the Relay Building, Whitechapel, London

Surnames